AstroSat-2 is India's second dedicated multi-wavelength space telescope, proposed by the Indian Space Research Organisation (ISRO) as the successor of the current Astrosat-1 observatory, which has a five-year operation time ending in 2020.

ISRO launched an 'Announcement of Opportunity' in February 2018 requesting proposals from Indian scientists for ideas and the development of instruments for astronomy and astrophysics.

See also

Indian Astronomical Observatory
List of space telescopes
Ultraviolet astronomy
X-ray astronomy

References

External links
 Astrosat
 ISRO

Space telescopes
Satellites of India
Proposed satellites